Group B was one of two groups of the 2018 IIHF World Championship. The four best placed teams advanced to the playoff round, while the last placed team is relegated to Division I in 2019.

Standings

Matches
All times are local (UTC+2).

United States vs Canada

Germany vs Denmark

Norway vs Latvia

Finland vs South Korea

Denmark vs United States

South Korea vs Canada

Germany vs Norway

Latvia vs Finland

United States vs Germany

Canada vs Denmark

South Korea vs Latvia

Finland vs Norway

Germany vs South Korea

Finland vs Denmark

United States vs Latvia

Norway vs Canada

Denmark vs Norway

United States vs South Korea

Latvia vs Germany

Denmark vs South Korea

Canada vs Finland

Norway vs United States

Germany vs Finland

South Korea vs Norway

Canada vs Latvia

Finland vs United States

Canada vs Germany

Latvia vs Denmark

References

External links
Official website

B